Skipp is a surname and given name. Notable people with this name include:

Surname
 Colin Skipp (1939–2019), British actor
 John Skipp (born 1957), author
 Oliver Skipp (born 2000), English football player
 Victor Skipp (1925–2010), English local historian, art collector and amateur philosopher

Given name
 Robert "Skipp" Orr, also known as Robert Orr (executive) (born 1953)
 Skipp Sudduth (born 1956), American theater, film and television actor
 Skipp Townsend, American gang expert
 Skipp Whitman, American hip-hop artist
 Skipp Williamson, Australian businesswoman